"DJ, Ease My Mind" is a single by Swedish recording group Niki & The Dove, from their debut studio album Instinct.

Music video
A music video to accompany the release of "DJ, Ease My Mind" was first released onto YouTube on 13 December 2011 at a total length of four minutes and fifteen seconds.

Skrillex version

A remixed version of the song by American record producer Skrillex, titled "Ease My Mind", was released as the penultimate track of Skrillex's debut studio album Recess (2014). The song was featured on an animated film clip titled "JOSHO", which was directed by David D. Navarro (better known as Roboto) and published to YouTube by Collide Film Studio on September 30, 2015. Two additional remixes by Jai Wolf and GTA were released on an EP entitled Ease My Mind v Ragga Bomb Remixes on November 24, 2014.

Track listing
Digital download
 "DJ, Ease My Mind" (Radio Edit) – 3:21
 "DJ, Ease My Mind" (Jakwob Remix) – 3:17
 "DJ, Ease My Mind" (Seamus Haji Remix) – 7:00
 "DJ, Ease My Mind" (Tom's Dove Tail Remix) – 6:43
 "DJ, Ease My Mind" (Twin Shadow Remix) – 2:49

Chart performance

Release history

References

2012 singles
2012 songs
2014 songs
Skrillex songs
Song recordings produced by Elof Loelv
Mercury Records singles